Mường Ảng is a district (huyện) of Điện Biên province in the Northwest region of Vietnam.

As of 2006, the district had a population 37,077. The district covers an area of 443.2 km2. The district capital lies at Mường Ảng town.

Mường Ảng is subdivided to a township and 9 rural communes, including Mường Ảng township and the communes of Ẳng Cang, Ẳng Nưa, Ẳng Tở, Búng Lao, Mường Đăng, Mường Lạn, Nặm Lịch, Ngối Cáy and Xuân Lao.

References

Districts of Điện Biên province
Điện Biên province